is an English property law and UK insolvency law case, concerning  whether an exclusivity agreement for buying sheepskins, that accompanied a loan, frustrated the borrower's right to pay off and discharge its debt.

Facts
In 1910 Kreglinger, who ran a woolbroker firm, agreed to lend New Patagonia Meat Ltd £10,000 secured by a floating charge on its business, repayable in five years, with an option to repay the remaining sum on a month’s notice. In addition, New Patagonia agreed to sell sheepskins exclusively to Kreglinger, or pay a commission if they sold to other persons, so long as New Patagonia gave the best price. When New Patagonia paid off the loan in 1913, and wished to start selling its sheepskins to other firms, Kreglinger claimed the right to an injunction to restrain them. New Patagonia argued that (i) that the provision was unconscionable, (ii) the exclusivity provision was in the nature of a penalty or a clog on the equity of redemption and should be consequently held void, and (iii) that the provision was repugnant to equitable right to redeem.

Lord Cozens-Hardy MR, Buckley LJ and Kennedy LJ held that the agreement was void. Kreglinger appealed.

Judgment
The House of Lords held that the option to purchase the sheepskins exclusively for five years was separate and sound from the main contract and not void, given that the purpose of the clog on equity of redemption rules was chiefly to preclude unconscionable bargains. Lord Haldane LC gave a general background to the rule that there be no clogs on the equity of redemption and remarked,

Lord Halsbury and Lord Atkinson concurred. Lord Mersey delivered a short concurrence. Lord Parker held too that the agreement was not void.

See also

Vernon v Bethell
Knightsbridge Estates Trust Ltd v Byrne [1940] AC 613
Santley v Wilde [1899] 2 Ch 474

Notes

References

United Kingdom insolvency case law
English property case law
House of Lords cases
1913 in British law
1913 in case law